The 1952 LFF Lyga was the 31st season of the LFF Lyga football competition in Lithuania.  It was contested by 12 teams, and KN Vilnius won the championship.

League standings

References
RSSSF

LFF Lyga seasons
1952 in Lithuania
LFF